Michael Hartnett (18 September 1941 – 13 October 1999) was an Irish poet who wrote in both English and Irish. He was one of the most significant voices in late 20th-century Irish writing and has been called "Munster's de facto poet laureate".

Early life and background
Michael Harnett was born in Croom Hospital, County Limerick. Although his parents' name was Harnett, he was registered in error as Hartnett on his birth certificate. In later life he declined to change this as his legal name was closer to the Irish Ó hAirtnéide. He grew up in the Maiden Street area of Newcastle West, Co. Limerick, spending much of his time with his grandmother Bridget Halpin, who resided in the townland of Camas, in the countryside nearby. Hartnett claimed that his grandmother, was one of the last native speakers to live in Co. Limerick, though she was originally from North Kerry. He claims that, although she spoke to him mainly in English, he would listen to her conversing with her friends in Irish, and as such, he was quite unaware of the imbalances between English and Irish, since he experienced the free interchange of both languages. When he began school, he claims that he was made aware of the tensions between both languages, and was surprised to discover that Irish was considered an endangered language, taught as a contrived, rule-laden code, with little of the literary attraction which it held for him. He was educated in the local national and secondary schools in Newcastle West. Hartnett emigrated to England the day after he finished his secondary education and went to work as a tea boy on a building site in London.

Early writings
Hartnett had started writing by this time and his work came to  the attention of the poet John Jordan, who was professor of English at University College Dublin.  Jordan invited Hartnett to attend the university for a year. While back in Dublin, Hartnett co-edited the literary magazine Arena with James Liddy. He also worked as curator of Joyce's tower at Sandycove for a time. He returned briefly to London, where he met Rosemary Grantley on 16 May 1965, and they were married on 4 April 1966. His first book, Anatomy of a Cliché, a book of love poetry dedicated to his wife was published in 1968 to critical acclaim and was the beginning of his serious writing life and he returned to live permanently in Dublin that same year.

He worked as a night telephonist at the telephone exchange on Exchequer Street. He now entered a productive relationship with New Writers Press, run by Michael Smith and Trevor Joyce. They published his next three books. The first of these was a translation from the Irish,  The Old Hag of Beare (1969), followed by Selected Poems (1970) and  Tao (1972). This last book was a version of the Chinese Tao Te Ching. His Gypsy Ballads (1973), a translation of the Romancero Gitano of Federico García Lorca  was published by the Goldsmith Press.

A Farewell to English
In 1974 Hartnett decided to leave Dublin to return to his rural roots, as well as deepen his relationship with the Irish language. He went to live in Templeglantine, five miles from Newcastle West, and worked for a time as a lecturer in creative writing at Thomond College of Education, Limerick. Also, in 1974, he first won both the Irish American Literature Award and the Arts Council Award in the same year. Then in 1975, he made the great and bold political statement that he was going to no longer write in English but that he was going to "court the language of his people" with the publication of A Farewell to English. A number of volumes in Irish followed: Adharca Broic (1978), An Phurgóid (1983) and Do Nuala: Foighne Chrainn (1984).He received the Irish-American Cultural Institute Award in 1980, the Irish Arts Council Award for the best book in Irish in 1986.  
 
A biography on this period of Michael Hartnett's life entitled 'A Rebel Act Michael Hartnett's Farewell To English' by Pat Walsh was published in 2012 by Mercier Press.

Later life and works
In 1984 he returned to Dublin to live in the suburb of Inchicore. The following year marked his return to English with the publication of Inchicore Haiku, a book that deals with the turbulent events in his personal life over the previous few years. This was followed by a number of books in English including A Necklace of Wrens (1987), Poems to Younger Women (1989) and The Killing of Dreams (1992). These critically acclaimed works contributed to his winning the Irish American Cultural Institute Award in 1988, and the American-Ireland Fund Literary Award in 1990. Selected and New Poems (1994) was published both in Ireland and the USA.

He also continued working in Irish, and produced a sequence of important volumes of translation of classic works into English. These included Ó Bruadair, Selected Poems of Dáibhí Ó Bruadair (1985) and Ó Rathaille The Poems of Aodhaghán Ó Rathaille (1999). His Collected Poems appeared in two volumes in 1984 and 1987 and New and Selected Poems in 1995. In 1999, the documentary film on his life and work: Michael Hartnett: Necklace of Wrens, was widely shown on Irish television to critical acclaim and won several prizes. Also, during the late 1990's, his poetry was added to the Irish final secondary school exam, the Leaving Certificate

Seamus Heaney has written that he is "one of the truest, most tested and beloved voices in Irish poetry in our time."  

Hartnett died from Alcoholic Liver Syndrome in October 1999 following a likely stroke in Listowel and after repeated visits to the hospital over the years. He is buried in Newcastle West.

The Collected Poems, A Book of Strays and Translations were published in 2001, 2002 and 2003 respectively by Gallery Press.

Éigse Michael Hartnett
Every April a literary and arts festival is held in Newcastle West in honour of Michael Hartnett. Events are organised throughout the town and a memorial lecture is given by a distinguished guest. Former speakers include Nuala O'Faolain, Paul Durcan, David Whyte and Fintan O'Toole. The annual Michael Hartnett Poetry Award of 4000 euro also forms part of the festival. Funded by the Limerick City and County Council Arts Office and the Arts Council of Ireland, it is intended to support and encourage poets in the furtherance of their writing endeavours. Previous winners include Sinéad Morrissey and Peter Sirr.

During the 2011 Éigse, Paul Durcan unveiled a bronze life-sized statue of Michael Hartnett sculpted by Rory Breslin, in the Square, Newcastle West. Hartnett's son Niall spoke at the unveiling ceremony.

Family life
Michael and Rosemary had a daughter Lara who lives in Australia and a son Niall who lives in Ireland. Niall manages the writer's estate and copyright in conjunction with Gallery Press.

Publication History 
 Anatomy of a Cliché (Dublin: Dolmen Press 1968) 
 The Hag of Beare, trans. from Irish (Dublin: New Writers Press 1969)
 A Farewell to English (Gallery Press 1975)
 Cúlú Íde/ The Retreat of Ita Cagney (Goldsmith Press 1975)
 Poems in English (Dublin: Dolmen Press 1977)
 Prisoners : (Gallery Press 1977)
 Adharca Broic (Gallery Press 1978)
 An Phurgóid (Coiscéim 1983)
 Do Nuala, Foidhne Chuainn ( Coiscéim 1984)
 Collected Poems Vol I  (Raven Arts Press 1984)
 Inchicore Haiku (Raven Arts Press 1985)
 An Lia Nocht (Coiscéim 1985)
 Collected Poems Vol II  (Raven Arts Press 1986)
 A Necklace of Wrens: Poems in Irish and English (Gallery Press 1987)
 Poems to Younger Women (Gallery Press 1988)
 The Killing of Dreams (Gallery Press 1992)
 Selected and New Poems (Gallery Press 1994)
 Collected Poems (Gallery Press 2001)
 A Book of Strays (Gallery Press 2001)

Select translations 
 Tao: A Version of the Chinese Classic of the Sixth Century (New Writers Press 1971)
 Gypsy Ballads: A Version of the Romancero Gitano of Federico Garcia Lorca (Newbridge: Goldsmith Press 1973)
 Ó Bruadair (Gallery Press 1985)
 Selected Poems of Nuala Ní Domhnaill (Raven Arts Press 1986)
 An Damh-Mhac, trans. from Hungarian of Ferenc (Juhász 1987)
 Dánta Naomh Eoin na Croise, translation from St. John of the Cross (Coiscéim 1991)
 Haicéad (Gallery Press 1993)
 Ó Rathaille: The Poems of Aodhaghán Ó Rathaille (Gallery Press 1999)
 Translations (Gallery Press 2002)

Reviews
 Murphy, Hayden (1976), review of A Farewell to English, in Burnett, Ray (ed.), Calgacus 3, Spring 1976, pp. 55 & 56,

References

Further reading
 Remembering Michael Hartnett Edited by Stephen Newman and John McDonagh; (November 2005); Four Courts Press; 
 ‘Wrestling with Hartnett’, by Eamon Grennan; in The Southern Review, Vol. 31, no. 3; (June 1995); p. 659
 Lawlor, James. “Are these my people?’ A Study of Contemporary Working-Class Irish Poetry M.A Diss. Queen's University Belfast. 2010. Print.
 ‘Male and Heretic: Michael Hartnett and Masculine Doubt’, by Val Nolan; lecture delivered to Southern Voices: A Symposium on Contemporary Munster Poetry in English; University College Cork; (May 2008)
 Notes From His Contemporaries: A Tribute to Michael Hartnett. Photographs by Niall Hartnett; (May 2009/ March 2010); Niall Hartnett.com/ Lulu Inc.
Purchase Book at Niallhartnett.com
 Official Facebook Page
 Michael Hartnett's page at Wake Forest University Press
Hartnett at Irish Writers Online
Mark Lonergan's essay on Michael Hartnett's "Inchicore Haiku"
Michael Hartnett file at Limerick City Library, Ireland
I Live in Michael HartnettI Live in Michael Hartnett (Revival Press 2013)  Poems in tribute, featuring work of Seamus Heaney, Eavan Boland, Paula Meehan, Brendan Kennelly  . Edited and introduced by James Lawlor with foreword by Joan Mac Kernan
 "A Rebel Act: Michael Hartnett's Farewell to English" Pat Walshe. (2012) Mericier Press.

1941 births
1999 deaths
20th-century Irish-language poets
People from Newcastle West
20th-century Irish poets
20th-century male writers
Irish male poets